Kwon Sung-hwan (born May 27, 1989), better known by his stage name Peakboy, is a South Korean rapper, record producer, and singer-songwriter. He released his debut single "Gin & Tonic" in 2017 via SoundCloud and first mini-album Portrait the following year. Since signing with Neuron Music, he has released two additional mini-albums and numerous stand-alone singles.

Early life
Peakboy was born Kwon Sung-hwan on May 27, 1989, the older of two sons. He lived in Gyeyang District, Incheon, where he attended Annam High School. He joined a company as a trainee and intended to become a vocalist by age 22 before giving up. He enlisted in mandatory military service and was discharged in 2016. After completing his service, he deliberated between being a pop music composer or a self-produced artist.

Career
Peakboy came up with his stage name the day before registering it with the Korea Copyright Commission. "Peak" refers to the peak point which arises when making music, and "boy" was attached due to its regular usage in the monikers of foreign record producers. Early in his career, Peakboy composed music for girl group Hello Venus. He would go on to take part in songwriting and production for other musicians, including on Urban Zakapa's "Another Me" (2015) and Kkal & Maxx's debut record Caffe in the Morning (2016). He also produced tracks for the fifth and sixth seasons of the rap competition series Show Me the Money. Peakboy joined the music crew Juicy Wave after having it suggested to him by rapper Kyu Young.

In 2017, Peakboy uploaded his debut single "Gin & Tonic" onto audio sharing website SoundCloud and he began receiving contract offers from various companies. His first mini-album Portrait and its lead single "Shame" featuring George were released on March 14, 2018. Peakboy signed an exclusive contract with Neuron Music and released the single album 05/27 through the record label on August 23, headed by the electronic hip-hop track "Birthday" with Hanhae as its featured guest. Peakboy penned the track in four days, which was influenced by his stay in the United States two months earlier. He released his second mini-album Us on April 11, 2019. "Kelly", released from the single album Frola, samples "Doowap" by labelmate Paul Kim. Its accompanying music video published the following month. By the end of the year, he held his first concert with Bibi on Christmas Eve.

Peakboy's third mini-album Loop, fronted by the lead single "Diet" featuring Wheein of Mamamoo, was released on August 18, 2020. From the following month, he hosted three episode of his radio program entitled Peakboy's Arcade on Naver Now. In early 2021, he accompanied Kim to Jeju Island for a music video shoot. Peakboy was inspired by the trip and the ongoing COVID-19 pandemic to write "Anywhere". A song about traveling, the R&B digital single was released on April 20. On July 25, the electronic hip-hop single "Gyopo Hairstyle" was issued. Its music video features cameos by model Han Hyun-min, actors Choi Woo-shik, Park Seo-joon, Park Hyung-sik, and singer V of BTS.

Musical style
Peakboy's song lyrics deal with his thoughts and experiences of everyday life. His lyricism has been noted for being blunt and candid, while his music has been described as trendy and original. The foundations of his work are classified as electronic and black music. In terms of voice type, he is a baritone. Writing for Atstar1 magazine, editor Hwang Yeon-do described Peakboy as one of the few musicians with a good musical tone, skilled rapping, and talented capabilities as a singer-songwriter. Peakboy cites You Hee-yeol, Yoon Jong-shin, and Yoon Sang as his role models.

Discography

Albums

Extended plays

Singles

As lead artist

As featured artist

Filmography

Television shows

Radio shows

References

1989 births
21st-century rappers
21st-century South Korean singers
Living people
Musicians from Incheon
South Korean baritones
South Korean contemporary R&B singers
South Korean electronic musicians
South Korean hip hop record producers
South Korean male rappers
South Korean male singer-songwriters